The filmography of Hugh O'Brian (April 19, 1925 – September 5, 2016) comprises both film and television roles. In a career spanning nearly seven decades, he has appeared in overall fifty-three feature films, sixteen television movies and forty-six series.

On screen, O'Brian debuted as Sailor in William Beaudine's drama Kidnapped (1948), while for television he made his debut in Arch Oboler's anthology series Oboler's Comedy Theatre (1949). In 1954, O'Brian won the Golden Globe as the Most Promising Newcomer - Male, while in 1957, he received a Primetime Emmy Award-nomination for Best Continuing Performance by an Actor in a Dramatic Series.

Filmography

Film

Television

References

Other sources

External links

 
 
 

Male actor filmographies
American filmographies